The 1990 Furman Paladins football team was an American football team that represented Furman University as a member of the Southern Conference (SoCon) during the 1990 NCAA Division I-AA football season. In their fifth year under head coach Jimmy Satterfield, the Paladins compiled an overall record of 9–4 with a conference mark of 6–1, winning the SoCon title. Furman advanced to the NCAA Division I-AA Football Championship playoffs, where they defeated  in the first round and lost to Nevada in the quarterfinals.

Schedule

References

Furman
Furman Paladins football seasons
Southern Conference football champion seasons
Furman Paladins football